The Bundesstraße 186  is a German federal highway. Originally, this road ran from Köthen to Bitterfeld. During East German rule, the number 186 was reassigned to a loop running around the city of Leipzig. Due to brown coal mining, two strips of road in the north (between Schkeuditz and Taucha) and the south (between Zwenkau and Markkleeberg) had to be demolished, splitting up the road into two segments.

In 2010, the eastern segment was degraded, leaving only the western segment.

186